{|
{{Infobox ship image
|Ship image=Buckler's Hard Maritime Museum 03 - HMS Gladiator figurehead.jpg
|Ship caption=Replica of HMS Gladiators figurehead at Buckler's Hard
}}

|}HMS Gladiator was a 44-gun fifth-rate Roebuck-class ship of the Royal Navy.  She was launched on 20 January 1783 by Henry Adams of Bucklers Hard.  She spent her entire career on harbour service, never putting to sea. Even so, her crew earned prize money for the seizure of two Russian and five American ships. Her sessile existence made her an excellent venue for courts-martial and a number of notable ones took place aboard her. She was broken up in 1817.

Career
Gladiator was commissioned in December 1792 under Lieutenant Samuel Hayter as a convalescent ship. Then, still under Hayter, she was recommissioned in February 1794 as a guardship. In December 1795 she was under the command of Lieutenant Stephen Parker, followed by Lieutenant Emanuel Hungerford from September 1799. She was Rear-Admiral Sir Richard Bickerton's flagship from February 1800 to May. Lieutenant Joseph Bromwich then took command of Gladiator, being succeeded in September by Lieutenant John Connolly. From December 1801 she was again a convalescent ship and the flagship for Rear-Admiral Sir John Holloway until April 1802 when she was paid off.

Gladiator  was recommissioned in April 1803 under Lieutenant Thomas Harrison. From May she was again Holloway's flagship until June 1804 when she became Rear-Admiral Sir Isaac Coffin's flagship. In February 1807 she came under the command of Lieutenant John Price as a convalescent ship.

On 26 October 1807, Tsar Alexander I of Russia declared war on Great Britain. The official news did not arrive there until 2 December, at which time the British declared an embargo on all Russian vessels in British ports. Gladiator was one of some 70 vessels that shared in the seizure of the 44-gun Russian frigate Speshnoy (Speshnyy), then in Portsmouth harbour. The British seized the Russian storeship Wilhelmina (Vilghemina) at the same time. The Russian vessels were carrying the payroll for Vice-Admiral Dmitry Senyavin’s squadron in the Mediterranean.

In 1811 Gladiator was under the command of Lieutenant Thomas Dutton and served as flagship for Rear-Admiral William Hargood. Lieutenant-Commander Charles Hewitt took command in July 1812, and Gladiator successively bore the flags of Rear Admirals Hargood, Edward Foote and Peter Halkett.

When news of the outbreak of the War of 1812 reached Britain, the Royal Navy seized all American vessels then in British ports. Gladiator was among the Royal Navy vessels then lying at Spithead or Portsmouth and so entitled to share in the grant for the American ships Belleville, Janus, Aeos, Ganges and Leonidas seized there on 31 July 1812.

Courts-martial
Because Gladiator spent her entire career in port, she provided a convenient venue for courts-martial. In 1800 alone she was the venue for over 30. In that year alcohol was causative in many cases, but not all.

The charges were proven so the court directed that Duncan be hanged.

The court-martial ordered one man hanged for desertion, which was an unusually harsh verdict. However, the man had deserted three times, after having enlisted three times (under different names) and taken the bounty money. Also, there had been a large number of desertions at Portsmouth and the court's intent was to send a message.

On 10 December a court-martial tried John Hubbard and George Hynes, seamen from HMS St George, for an unnatural crime. The court found them guilty and sentenced them to death.

At least three courts-martial involved charges against Admirals. The first occurred between 23 and 26 December 1805, after the Battle of Cape Finisterre (1805). Admiral Robert Calder requested a court-martial to review his decision not to pursue the enemy fleet after the engagement. The court ruled that Calder's failure to pursue was an error of judgement, not a manifestation of cowardice or disaffection, and severely reprimanded him.

The second occurred between 6 and 11 March 1807. The accused was Sir Home Popham and the charge was that he had conducted an unapproved (and notably quixotic and unsuccessful) expedition to Buenos Ayres, leaving his duty station, the Cape of Good Hope, undefended. The charge was found proven and the court reprimanded Sir Home.

The third was the court-martial of Admiral Lord Gambier for his conduct of the Battle of the Basque Roads. Admiral Sir Eliab Harvey, who had commanded "The Fighting Temeraire" at the Battle of Trafalgar, believed that Gambier had missed an opportunity to inflict further damage upon the French fleet.  He told Gambier "I never saw a man so unfit for the command of a fleet as Your Lordship." Thomas Cochrane threatened to use his parliamentary vote against Gambier for not committing the fleet to action. Gambier called for a court-martial to examine his conduct. The court, on 26 July 1809 exonerated Gambier. Consequently, neither Harvey nor Cochrane were appointed by the Admiralty to command for the duration of the war.

Another notable court-martial took place on 5–6 February 1810. Some months after Lake had abandoned the sailor, Lake's commanding officer, Sir Alexander Cochrane, discovered what had happened and immediately ordered Lake to retrieve Jeffery. When Recruit arrived at Sombrero, Jeffery could not be found. (An American ship had picked up Jeffery  and he was eventually discovered some three years later in Massachusetts. He returned to Britain where Lake provided compensation in lieu of a suit.) The subsequent court-martial ordered that Lake be dismissed from the service.

The court honourably acquitted Lieutenant Henry Ducie Chads and the other surviving officers and men of Java.

What was probably one of the last courts-martial held on Gladiator occurred between 18 and 21 August 1815. The court honourably acquitted Captain Pring and the others.

Fate
Gladiator was paid off on 5 October 1815. She was broken up in August 1817.

Notes, citations, and referencesNotesCitationsReferences'''
 
Duckworth, Sir John Thomas (1805) Minutes of a court martial, holden on board His Majesty's ship Gladiator, in Portsmouth Harbour: on Thursday, the 25th day of April, 1805, and the two following days, for the trial of Sir J.T. Duckworth, K.B., Vice Admiral of the Blue, on charges exhibited against him by Captain James Anthol Wood, of the Royal Navy''. (London: Longman, Hurst, Rees, and Orme).

External links
HMS Gladiator's career

1783 ships
Ships built on the Beaulieu River